King of the Hill is an American adult animated television series created by Mike Judge and Greg Daniels. The series focuses on the Hills, a middle-class American family in the fictional city of Arlen, Texas. It originally aired on Fox from January 12, 1997, to September 13, 2009; with four episodes from the final season premiering in syndication from May 3 to May 6, 2010. A total of 259 episodes aired over the course of 13 seasons.

Series overview

Episodes

Season 1 (1997)

Season 2 (1997–98)

Season 3 (1998–99)

Season 4 (1999–2000)

Season 5 (2000–01)

Season 6 (2001–02)

Season 7 (2002–03)

Season 8 (2003–04)

Season 9 (2004–05)

Season 10 (2005–06)

Season 11 (2007)

Season 12 (2007–08)

Season 13 (2008–10)

References

External links

 
 King of the Hill at the Big Cartoon DataBase

Lists of American adult animated television series episodes
Lists of American sitcom episodes